Absorbing the Disarray is the third studio album by Swedish death metal band Visceral Bleeding.

Track listing

Personnel 
Performers
Martin Pedersen – vocals
Martin Bermheden – guitar
Peter Persson – guitar
Calle Löfgren – bass
Tobbe Persson – drums

References

2006 albums
Visceral Bleeding albums